Pancawarna is the sixth studio album from Malaysian pop singer Siti Nurhaliza released in 1999.

"Kau Kekasihku" is the most highlighted song in this album for its popularity plus the voice of Siti Nurhaliza, the composition by Ajai and the melancholic lyrics by Alam Maya. It is said to have been the first song ever composed by Ajai himself to Siti.

Almost every song in this album really challenge Siti's vocal performance and the most highly enduring songs would be "Kurniaan Dalam Samaran" and "Nian Di Hati".

In Lembaran Cinta Pudar Siti made an attempt to have a brief monologue which is quite intriguing to listeners.

The song title Lelaki (warkah seorang anak) was specially dedicated to then-Prime Minister of Malaysia, Tun Dr. Mahathir bin Mohamad. The lyrics were written by Habsah Hassan and composed by one of the Kopratasa's member (Siso). This song is made special just for him as a remembrance of his contribution to Malaysia.

Reception
Pancawarna was released on 7 May 1999 to popular success and receive positive reviews from music critics. According to Marina Abdul Ghani of The Malay Mail, Pancawarna which means colourful in English refers to the wide varieties of music styles that were featured in the album. The album received mixed to positive reviews from music critics. Saniboey of Harian Metro gave the album three stars. He commented the album missed its target, inconsistent with its melodies, and too cheesy. Zainal Alam Kadir of New Straits Times gave the album three and half stars. He echoed Saniboey's opinion on the presence of multiple heart-wrenching ballads in the album, but he has no qualms with Siti's vocals. In a positive review by Marina of The Malay Mail, she commended Siti's vocals and how well she carried her vocals on all songs featured in the album. Pancawarna was well-received by the public. More than 100,000 units of Pancawarna were sold and it also charted at number one on RIM's local album chart.

Track listing

Credits and personnel
Credits adapted from Adiwarna booklet liner notes.

 Ajai – producer
 Alfa/Rummie – producer
 Ross Ariffin – producer
 Ariffin – promotional unit
 Azmeer – producer
 Bard – promotional unit
 Bustamam – photography
 CT – vocals
 Daniel – vocals
 Azam Dungun – songwriter
 Jason Foo – production coordinator
 Adnan Abu Hassan – producer
 Hazlan Abu Hassan – songwriter
 Sham Amir Hussain – A & R manager, songwriter
 Habsah Hassan – songwriter
 June – vocals
 Ricky Koes – producer
 Siso Kopratasa – producer
 Genesis Mastering Lab – mastering
 Lau – engineer

 Lin – promotional unit, vocals
 Tan Su Loke – executive producer
 Zulkefli Majid – A & R coordinator, producer, vocals
 Alam Maya – songwriter
 Hani MJ – songwriter
 Nan – promotional unit
 Siti Nurhaliza – songwriter
 Nurul – make-up
 AS Design & Print – creation
 Rahayu – promotional unit
 Salman – producer
 Shon – vocals
 S. Amin Shahab – songwriter
 Alison Tee – project manager
 Tisya – songwriter, vocals
 Vincent – engineer
 Mark Wong – producer
 Wong – engineer
 Helen Yap – producer

Awards
Platinum
 2 Platinum Award for "Pancawarna"

Juara Lagu 2000
 Best Ballad (Kau Kekasihku)

Juara Lagu 2001
 Best Pop Rock (Engkau Bagaikan Permata)

Anugerah Majalah Rish (URS) 2001
 Most Popular Love Song (Kau Kekasihku)

References

External links
 Siti Nurhaliza- Official Website
 Siti Nurhaliza  Collections
 Album Review

1999 albums
Siti Nurhaliza albums
Suria Records albums
Malay-language albums